Two Left Feet is a 1963 British comedy-drama film directed by Roy Ward Baker and starring Nyree Dawn Porter, Michael Crawford, David Hemmings and Julia Foster.

Plot

Based on David Stuart Leslie's novel, Two Left Feet is a story about Alan Crabbe (Michael Crawford) a callow youth desperate for a date with any girl who can offer him the experience he lacks. Every time Alan tries a manful stride into the jungle of sex, his two left feet turn the attempt into a trip-and-stumble. Then he meets Eileen (Nyree Dawn Porter), the new waitress at the corner cafe, and some sparks begin to fly.

Behind the scenes

At the time of its cinema release it was given an X Certificate (and given a 15 Rating when released on video in 1994).

Baker's expectations were high, hoping to attract a wide popularity on the basis of the film being aimed at a young audience, with most of the film's leading players being under 21 years of age, but his hopes were dashed because of difficulties obtaining a release - none of the actors at the time were stars, the film received an X Certificate, and it was eventually released on a poorly promoted Double bill, after a delay of two years being left on the shelf.

The film was based on the 1960 novel In My Solitude by David Stuart Leslie.

Tommy Bruce sang "Two Left Feet" to the opening credits of the film. It also featured the song "Where Were You When I Needed You?" by Susan Maughan.

In the opening sequence, Michael Crawford visits the West End and ends up queuing to see Pamela Green in the nudist movie Naked as Nature Intended.

Baker called it a "disaster. I fiddled around tried to make a picture of my own which I did, put money into it. That was a nice little picture, with a wonderful cast... and I was quite pleased with it, but nobody wanted to show it, nobody wanted to see it, we couldn’t get a circuit release and so I went into television."

References

External links

1963 films
1963 comedy-drama films
Films directed by Roy Ward Baker
British comedy-drama films
Films with screenplays by John Hopkins
1960s English-language films
1960s British films